Sloboda is a rural locality (a village) in Tolshmenskoye Rural Settlement, Totemsky  District, Vologda Oblast, Russia. The population was 25 as of 2002. There are 2 streets.

Geography 
Sloboda is located 68 km southwest of Totma (the district's administrative centre) by road. Krasnoye is the nearest rural locality.

References 

Rural localities in Totemsky District